Valentin Andres Tanga Flores IV, known by his professional name as Von Flores, is a Filipino-Canadian actor. He is often cast as commanding or aggressive characters.

Early life and education
Von was born in Malabon and lived in Pateros until age 13 when his family migrated to Toronto, Ontario, Canada. He studied at the American Academy of Dramatic Arts in New York City and the Centre for Actors' Study in Toronto.

Career
Flores' first audition landed him a guest starring role on Night Heat. Flores went on to perform roles in a number of television productions, including the series Kung Fu: The Legend Continues and the Atlantis Films TekWar, TekJustice and TekLords TV movies. He has guest starred on such series as The Adventures of Sinbad, Lonesome Dove: The Outlaw Years, Forever Knight, E.N.G., Street Legal and Degrassi: The Next Generation.

Flores played Ronald Sandoval in Gene Roddenberry's Earth: Final Conflict, one of the lead characters and the only character to regularly appear in all 5 seasons.

Flores has also appeared in feature films, most notably in the critically acclaimed I Love a Man in Uniform and Eclipse. He also appeared in the 1995 film Picture Perfect as well as in the 1998 film Dogboys with Dean Cain and Tia Carrere.

Flores played Suba, a uranium smuggler in La Femme Nikita episode "Treasom" (S1E7), which was broadcast on CTV and USA Network. In other work, he has played multiple roles in a variety of episodes the internationally acclaimed television programme Mayday, his first role coming as Captain Ed Reyes in the season three episode "Bomb on Board" (Philippine Airlines Flight 434). Since then, he has played Captain Zaharie Ahmad Shah in "Where is Malaysia 370?" (Malaysia Airlines flight 370) and co-pilot Zuwaldi in "Lethal Turn" (Garuda Indonesia Flight 152). More recently, he has played the part of the lead investigators in the episodes "Caught on Tape" (TransAsia Airways Flight 235), "Deadly Go Round" (China Airlines Flight 140), "No Warning" (Trigana Air Flight 267), and "Grounded: Boeing Max 8" (Lion Air Flight 610).

Filmography

Film

Television

References

External links
 
 Von Flores at NorthernStars.ca
 Von Flores as Ronald Sandoval at Earth: Final Conflict official site

1960 births
American Academy of Dramatic Arts alumni
Living people
Filipino emigrants to Canada
Filipino expatriates in Canada
Filipino male television actors
Canadian male film actors
Canadian male television actors
Canadian male actors of Filipino descent
People from Malabon
Filipino male film actors